Actinophytocola is a genus in the phylum Actinomycetota (Bacteria).

Etymology
(from Latin noun ), a dweller, inhabitant; New Latin masculine gender noun Actinophytocola, actinobacterial dweller inside a plant.

Species
The genus contains 10 species (including basonyms and synonyms), namely
 A. algeriensis Bouznada et al. 2016
 A. burenkhanensis (Ara et al. 2011; New Latin masculine gender adjective , of or belonging to Burenkhan, isolated from soil of Burenkhan, Khuvsgul province, Mongolia.)
 A. corallina (Otoguro et al. 2011; Latin feminine gender adjective , coral red, because the organism produces coral-coloured soluble pigment.)
 A. gilvus Sun et al. 2014
 A. glycyrrhizae Cao et al. 2018
 A. oryzae (Indananda et al. 2010,  (Type species of the genus).; Latin noun , rice and also the name of a botanical genus; Latin genitive case noun , of rice, denoting the isolation of the type strain from roots of Thai glutinous rice plants.)
 A. sediminis Zhang et al. 2014
 A. timorensis (Otoguro et al. 2011; New Latin feminine gender adjective , of or pertaining to (West) Timor, Indonesia, from where the type strain was isolated.)
 A. xanthii Wang et al. 2017
 A. xinjiangensis Guo et al. 2011

See also
 Bacterial taxonomy
 Microbiology

References

Bacteria genera
Actinomycetota